Operation Northwoods was a proposed false flag operation against American citizens that originated within the US Department of Defense of the United States government in 1962. The proposals called for CIA operatives to both stage and commit acts of violent terrorism against American military and civilian targets, blaming them on the Cuban government, and using it to justify a war against Cuba. The possibilities detailed in the document included the remote control of civilian aircraft which would be secretly repainted as US Air Force planes, a fabricated 'shoot down' of a US Air Force fighter aircraft off the coast of Cuba, the possible assassination of Cuban immigrants, sinking boats of Cuban refugees on the high seas, blowing up a U.S. ship, and orchestrating terrorism in U.S. cities.  The proposals were rejected by President John F. Kennedy.

Fidel Castro had taken power in Cuba in 1959 and began allowing communists into the new Cuban government, nationalizing U.S. businesses and improving relations with the Soviet Union, arousing the concern of the U.S. military due to the Cold War. The operation proposed creating public support for a war against Cuba by blaming it for terrorist acts that would actually be perpetrated by the U.S. government. To this end, Operation Northwoods proposals recommended hijackings and bombings followed by the introduction of phony evidence that would implicate the Cuban government. It stated:
The desired result from the execution of this plan would be to place the United States in the apparent position of suffering defensible grievances from a rash and irresponsible government of Cuba and to develop an international image of a Cuban threat to peace in the Western Hemisphere.

Several other proposals were included within Operation Northwoods, including real or simulated actions against various U.S. military and civilian targets. The operation recommended developing a "Communist Cuban terror campaign in the Miami area, in other Florida cities and even in Washington", which involved the bombing of civilian targets, which was to be blamed on the Cuban government to paint a false image of Fidel Castro and misinform the American public.

The plan was drafted by the Joint Chiefs of Staff, signed by Chairman Lyman Lemnitzer and sent to the Secretary of Defense. Although part of the US government's anti-communist Cuban Project, Operation Northwoods was never officially accepted; it was authorized by the Joint Chiefs of Staff, but then rejected by President Kennedy. None of the false flag operations became active under the auspices of the Operation Northwoods proposals.

Origins and public release 
The main Operations Northwoods proposal was presented in a document titled "Justification for U.S. Military Intervention in Cuba (TS)," a top secret collection of draft memoranda written by the Department of Defense (DoD) and the Joint Chiefs of Staff (JCS). The document was presented by the Joint Chiefs of Staff to Secretary of Defense Robert McNamara on 13 March 1962 as a preliminary submission for planning purposes. The Joint Chiefs recommended that both the covert and overt aspects of any such operation be assigned to them.
The previously secret document was originally made public on 18 November 1997, by the John F. Kennedy Assassination Records Review Board, a U.S. federal agency overseeing the release of government records related to John F. Kennedy's assassination. A total of 1,521 pages of once-secret military records covering 1962 to 1964 were concomitantly declassified by said Review Board.

"Appendix to Enclosure A" and "Annex to Appendix to Enclosure A" of the Northwoods document were first published online by the National Security Archive on 6 November 1998 in a joint venture with CNN as part of its 1998 Cold War television documentary series—specifically, as a documentation supplement to "Episode 10: Cuba," which aired on 29 November 1998. "Annex to Appendix to Enclosure A" is the section of the document which contains the proposals to stage false flag terrorist attacks. 

The Northwoods document was published online in a more complete form, including cover memoranda, by the National Security Archive on 30 April 2001.

Provocations 
In response to a request for pretexts for military intervention by the Chief of Operations of the Cuba Project, Brig. Gen. Edward Lansdale, the document listed methods, including false flag provocations, and outlined plans, that the authors believed would garner public and international support for U.S. military intervention in Cuba. According to the documents, the plan called for several steps to be taken in an attempt to provoke Cuba into an action against the United States, then blame it for "hostilities" carried out by the U.S. against its own military base at Guantanamo; these would be followed by executing offensive operations there against tactical Cuban civilian targets and military emplacements, leading to "large scale United States military operations":

Related Operation Mongoose proposals 

In addition to Operation Northwoods, under the Operation Mongoose program the U.S. Department of Defense had a number of similar proposals for actions to be taken against the Cuban regime of Fidel Castro.

Twelve of these proposals come from a 2 February 1962 memorandum entitled "Possible Actions to Provoke, Harass or Disrupt Cuba," written by Brig. Gen. William H. Craig and submitted to Brig. Gen. Edward Lansdale, the commander of the Operation Mongoose project.

The memorandum outlines Operation Bingo, a false flag plan to "create an incident which has the appearance of an attack on U.S. facilities (GMO) in Cuba, thus providing an excuse for use of U.S. military might to overthrow the current government of Cuba."

It also includes Operation Dirty Trick, another false flag plot to blame Castro if the 1962 Mercury manned space flight carrying John Glenn crashed, saying: "The objective is to provide irrevocable proof that, should the MERCURY manned orbit flight fail, the fault lies with the Communists et al. Cuba ." It continues, "This to be accomplished by manufacturing various pieces of evidence which would prove electronic interference on the part of the Cubans."

Even after General Lemnitzer lost his job as the chairman of the Joint Chiefs of Staff, the Joint Chiefs still planned false-flag pretext operations at least into 1963. A different U.S. Department of Defense policy paper created in 1963 discussed a plan to make it appear that Cuba had attacked a member of the Organization of American States (OAS) so that the United States could retaliate. The U.S. Department of Defense document says of one of the scenarios, "A contrived 'Cuban' attack on an OAS member could be set up, and the attacked state could be urged to take measures of self-defense and request assistance from the U.S. and OAS."

The plan expressed confidence that by this action, "the U.S. could almost certainly obtain the necessary two-thirds support among OAS members for collective action against Cuba."

Included in the nations the Joint Chiefs suggested as targets for covert attacks were Jamaica and Trinidad-Tobago. Since both were members of the British Commonwealth, the Joint Chiefs hoped that by secretly attacking them and then falsely blaming Cuba, the United States could incite the people of the United Kingdom into supporting a war against Castro. As the U.S. Department of Defense report noted:

Any of the contrived situations described above are inherently, extremely risky in our democratic system in which security can be maintained, after the fact, with very great difficulty. If the decision should be made to set up a contrived situation it should be one in which participation by U.S. personnel is limited only to the most highly trusted covert personnel. This suggests the infeasibility of the use of military units for any aspect of the contrived situation."

The U.S. Department of Defense report even suggested covertly paying a person in Castro's government to stage a false flag attack against the United States: "The only area remaining for consideration then would be to bribe one of Castro's subordinate commanders to initiate an attack on [the U.S. Navy base at] Guantanamo."

Reaction 

Kennedy rejected the Northwoods proposal. A JCS/Pentagon document, a memo by Lansdale entitled MEETING WITH THE PRESIDENT, 16 MARCH 1962, reads: "General Lemnitzer commented that the military had contingency plans for U.S. intervention. Also it had plans for creating plausible pretexts to use force, with the pretext either attacks on U.S. aircraft or a Cuban action in Latin America for which we could retaliate. The President said bluntly that we were not discussing the use of military force, that General Lemnitzer might find the U.S. so engaged in Berlin or elsewhere that he couldn't use the contemplated 4 divisions in Cuba." The proposal was sent for approval to the secretary of defense, Robert McNamara, but was not implemented.

Following presentation of the Northwoods plan, Kennedy removed Lemnitzer as Chairman of the Joint Chiefs of Staff, although he became Supreme Allied Commander of NATO in January 1963. U.S. military leaders began to perceive Kennedy as going soft on Cuba, and the President became increasingly unpopular with the military. A rift had already reared during Kennedy's disagreements with the service chiefs over the Cuban Missile Crisis in October 1962 and flared up again with his June 10, 1963 announcement of a unilateral U.S. Test Ban Treaty.

Physical documentation on Operation Northwoods became declassified through the John F. Kennedy Assassination Records Collection Act of 1992. This act declassified a total of four million documents, including Operation Northwoods, and was made available through the National Archives in College Park, Maryland. However, public knowledge of Operation Northwoods did not come until 2001 with the release of a book by the author James Bamford titled Body of Secrets.

On 3 August 2001, the National Assembly of People's Power of Cuba (the main legislative body of the Republic of Cuba) issued a statement referring to Operation Northwoods and Operation Mongoose wherein it condemned such U.S. government plans.

See also 

 Gulf of Tonkin Incident
 Operation Gladio
 Family Jewels (Central Intelligence Agency)
 Operation WASHTUB
 Proactive, Preemptive Operations Group
 Operation Himmler
 Bay of Pigs Invasion
 Operation Sea-Spray

References

Further reading 
 Jon Elliston, editor, Psywar on Cuba: The Declassified History of U.S. Anti-Castro Propaganda (Melbourne, Australia and New York: Ocean Press, 1999), .

External links 

 The Full Operation Northwoods document in both JPEG and fully searchable HTML format.
 High resolution scans from the National Archives, main pages: 1, 2, 3, 4, 5
 Scott Shane and Tom Bowman with contribution from Laura Sullivan, "New book on NSA sheds light on secrets: U.S. terror plan was Cuba invasion pretext," Baltimore Sun, 24 April 2001.
 Ron Kampeas, "Memo: U.S. Mulled Fake Cuba Pretext," Associated Press (AP), 25 April 2001.
 Bruce Schneier, "'Body of Secrets' by James Bamford: The author of a pioneering work on the NSA delivers a new book of revelations about the mysterious agency's coverups, eavesdropping and secret missions," Salon.com, 25 April 2001.
 David Ruppe, "U.S. Military Wanted to Provoke War With Cuba; Book: U.S. Military Drafted Plans to Terrorize U.S. Cities to Provoke War With Cuba," ABC News, 1 May 2001.
 "The Truth Is Out There—1962 memo from National Security Agency," Harper's Magazine, July 2001.
 Chris Floyd, "Head Cases," Moscow Times, 21 December 2001, pg. VIII; also appeared in St. Petersburg Times, Issue 733 (100), 25 December 2001.
 National Security Archive, "Pentagon Proposed Pretext for Cuba Invasion in 1962", April 30, 2001.

1962 in the United States
Cold War intelligence operations
Cuba–United States relations
Opposition to Fidel Castro
Government documents of the United States
American propaganda during the Cold War
Terrorism in the United States
False flag operations
Covert operations
Northwoods